Sesbania is a genus of flowering plants in the pea family, Fabaceae, and the only genus found in tribe Sesbanieae. Riverhemp is a common name for plants in this genus. Notable species include the rattlebox (Sesbania punicea), spiny sesbania (Sesbania bispinosa), and Sesbania sesban, which is used in cooking. Plants of this genus, some of which are aquatic, can be used in alley cropping to increase the soil's nitrogen content. The species of rhizobia responsible for nitrogen fixation in Sesbania rostrata is Azorhizobium caulinodans.

Some 60 species are currently accepted, with about 39 still unresolved. The largest number of species are found in Africa, and the remainder in Australia, Hawaii, and Asia.

Fossil record
Fossil seed pods from the upper Oligocene resembling Sesbania have been found in the Hungarian locality of Eger Wind-brickyard. The fossil species grew in a swampy and riparian environment.

List of species

 Sesbania benthamiana
 Sesbania bispinosa (Jacq.) W.Wight
 Sesbania brachycarpa

 Sesbania brevipedunculata
 Sesbania campylocarpa
 Sesbania cannabina Poir.
 Sesbania chippendalei
 Sesbania cinerascens
 Sesbania coerulescens
 Sesbania concolor
 Sesbania dalzielii
 Sesbania drummondii (Rydb.) Cory
 Sesbania dummeri
 Sesbania emerus (Aubl.) Urban – coffeebean
 Sesbania erubescens
 Sesbania exasperata
 Sesbania formosa
 Sesbania goetzei
 Sesbania grandiflora (L.) Poir.
 Sesbania greenwayi
 Sesbania hepperi
 Sesbania herbacea (Mill.) McVaugh – bigpod sesbania
 Sesbania hirtistyla
 Sesbania hobdyi
 Sesbania javanica
 Sesbania keniensis
 Sesbania leptocarpa
 Sesbania longifolia
 Sesbania macowaniana
 Sesbania macrantha
 Sesbania macroptera
 Sesbania madagascariensis
 Sesbania microphylla
 Sesbania notialis
 Sesbania oligosperma
 Sesbania pachycarpa

 Sesbania paucisemina

 Sesbania punicea (Cav.) Benth. – rattlebox
 Sesbania quadrata
 Sesbania rostrata

 Sesbania sericea (Willd.) Link – papagayo
 Sesbania sesban (Jacq.) W.Wight – Egyptian riverhemp
 Sesbania simpliciuscula
 Sesbania somaliensis
 Sesbania speciosa
 Sesbania sphaerosperma
 Sesbania subalata
 Sesbania sudanica
 Sesbania tetraptera
 Sesbania tomentosa Hook. & Arn. – Ōhai (Hawaii)
 Sesbania transvaalensis J.B.Gillett
 Sesbania vesicaria (Jacq.) Elliott
 Sesbania virgata'' (Cav.) Pers. – wand riverhemp

References

External links

Faboideae
Tropical agriculture
Fabaceae genera